The Waco CG-3A was a US light troop military glider of World War II.

Design and development
The CG-3A was the United States Army Air Force's first production troop-carrying glider. 300 CG-3A 9-place gliders were initially ordered, but 200 of these were cancelled. A few of the 100 built by Commonwealth Aircraft (formerly Rearwin Aircraft) were used as trainers for the improved CG-4A, but most remained in their shipping crates in storage. The production CG-3A was developed from the experimental XCG-3 which was the only one built by Waco and given Army Air Forces Serial No. 41-29617.

Operational history
The CG-3A became obsolete with the development of the much improved Waco designed CG-4A 15-place glider with its alternate load of military equipment. The CG-3A did not see any combat and several were used in limited training roles.

Variants
XCG-3 : Prototype 8-seat glider. One built 1942.
CG-3A : Production 9-seat glider. 100 built by Commonwealth Aircraft.

Specifications (CG-3A)

See also

References

1940s United States military gliders
1940s United States military transport aircraft
World War II transport aircraft of the United States
CG-3A
Aircraft first flown in 1942